Denis Williams (1 February 1923 – 28 June 1998) was a Guyanese painter, author and archaeologist.

Biography
Dr. Denis Joseph Ivan Williams, C.C.H., Hon. D. Lit., M.A., called by his friends "Sonny" Williams, was born in Georgetown, Guyana, where he received his early education; he was granted a Cambridge Junior School Certificate in 1940 and a Cambridge Senior School Certificate in 1941. His promise as a painter won him a two-year British Council Scholarship to the Camberwell School of Art in London in 1946. He lived in London for the next 10 years, during which he taught fine art as a lecturer at the Central School of Art and visiting tutor at the Slade School of Art. He also held several one-man shows of his work, and produced the artwork for Bajan novelist George Lamming's first book In the Castle of my Skin. From 1957 to 1962 he lectured on fine art at Khartoum Technical Institute. He later became a researcher at the Institute of African Studies at the University of Ife.

In 1980 he began intensive archaeological and paleoclimatic investigations of the shell middens on the northwest coast of Guyana. From the beginning of his studies, he was aware of potential disturbance of stratigraphy, errors in radiocarbon dates, and other pitfalls, and some of his efforts to detect them were detailed in Early Pottery on the Amazon: A Correction.

Evidence for a correlation between the declining productivity of mangrove resources and changes in artefacts and settlement behaviour was summarised in Some Subsistence Implications of Holocene Climatic Change in Northwestern Guyana. His observation that the methods employed by the Warao for processing palm starch are preadapted for eliminating the poison from bitter manioc offers a reasonable explanation for the origin of this remarkable technology. A monograph detailing his evidence and interpretations of the interaction between environmental change and Guyana prehistory was in press at the time of his death.

He recognised the importance of publication and in 1978 founded Archaeology and Anthropology, the journal of the Walter Roth Museum of Anthropology in Georgetown. Among other journals Williams edited were Odu (the University of Ife Journal of African studies) and Lagos Notes and Records, and he contributed numerous essays on art to books and journals. His skill as a writer is documented not only in his scientific papers, but in two novels and numerous short stories.

In 1986 Williams and his assistant, Jennifer Wishart, initiated a programme for junior archaeologists in Guyanese secondary schools.

Awards
His accomplishments were recognised in several national awards, including the Golden Arrow of Achievement Award from the government of Guyana in 1973, and the Cacique Crown of Honour in 1989, the same year that he received an honorary doctorate from the University of the West Indies.

Selected works

Fiction
 Other Leopards. London: New Authors Ltd, 1963. Reprinted Peepal Tree Press, 2009.
 The Third Temptation. London: Calder and Boyars, 1968. Reprinted Peepal Tree Press, 2010.

Non-Fiction
 Image and Idea in the Arts of Guyana (1969)
 Giglioli in Guyana, 1922–1972 (1973)
 Icon and Image: A Study of Sacred and Secular Forms of African Classical Art (1974)
 Contemporary Art in Guyana (1976)
 Guyana, Colonial Art to Revolutionary Art, 1966–1976
 Habitat and Culture in Ancient Guyana (1984)
 Pages in Guyanese Prehistory (1995)
 Prehistoric Guyana (2003)

Further reading
 Charlotte Williams and Evelyn A. Williams (eds), Denis Williams, a Life in Works: New and Collected Essays, Editions Rodopi B.V., 2010.
 Victor J. Ramraj, "Denis Williams (1923–)", in Daryl Cumber Dance, Fifty Caribbean Writers: A Bio-Bibliographical Critical Sourcebook, Westport, CT: Greenwood, 1986, pp. 483–92.

References

Guyanese scientists
Guyanese writers
University of Guyana alumni
1923 births
1998 deaths
Academic staff of the University of Lagos
Academic staff of Makerere University
Academic staff of Obafemi Awolowo University
People from Georgetown, Guyana
Guyanese archaeologists
20th-century Guyanese painters
20th-century Guyanese writers
20th-century archaeologists
Guyanese expatriates in the United Kingdom
Guyanese expatriates in Nigeria